Walter Verheyen's African dormouse (Graphiurus walterverheyeni) is a monotypic species of rodent in the family Gliridae. From the Central Congolian lowland forests ecoregion in the central Congo Basin, it has been found in west-central Democratic Republic of the Congo, in the vicinity of the Lukenie River and of Wafania, near the left bank of the Luilaka River. Although not found in immediate association, Lorraine's dormouse (Graphiurus lorraineus) and the short-eared African dormouse (Graphiurus surdus) are understood to be "broadly sympatric". Most closely resembling Jentink's dormouse (Graphiurus crassicaudatus), it differs from this species both in its much smaller size and in its relative proportions. On the IUCN Red List, its conservation status has been assessed as Data Deficient.

See also
 Walter Verheyen's mouse
 Walter's duiker
 Lomami River
 Lualaba River
 Sankuru Nature Reserve

References

Graphiurus
Mammals described in 2009
Mammals of the Democratic Republic of the Congo
Endemic fauna of the Democratic Republic of the Congo